The Bethpage Black Course is a public golf course at Bethpage State Park on Long Island, New York. The course was designed by Joseph H. Burbeck and was assisted by noted golf architect A. W. Tillinghast. It is the most difficult of Bethpage's five courses, and is known for the warning sign at the first tee, placed in the early 1980s, which reads "WARNING The Black Course Is An Extremely Difficult Course Which We Recommend Only For Highly Skilled Golfers". The course has hosted a number of major championships in recent years, including the 2002 U.S. Open, 2009 U.S. Open, and 2019 PGA Championship.

Rankings
In its July 2008 list of America's greatest golf courses Golf Digest ranked Bethpage Black #26 overall, #6 in the state of New York, #6 of America's 50 toughest courses, and #5 of America's greatest public golf courses. It is also the top-ranked course in the Golf Digest list that is operated by a governmental entity. In September 2020, Golf Advisor ranked Bethpage Black as #1 overall in a list of the top 50 toughest golf courses in the United States.

Scorecard

History

Opened in 1936, it was designed by Bethpage State Park superintendent Joseph H. Burbeck, who was also responsible for the park's Blue and Red Courses in the mid-1930s. Brief consultation was also provided by noted golf architect A. W. Tillinghast. 

In 1972, the course record was set by Mel Galletta Jr. when he shot a 65. Club pro Rick Hartmann tied the record in 2001 during the second round of the Metropolitan Open.

U.S. Opens

The 2002 U.S. Open was won by Tiger Woods, the only player to break par for the tournament. It was seen as one of the most difficult and exciting U.S. Opens in history, breaking attendance records and creating a more boisterous atmosphere for the championship. Its 17th hole rivaled the 16th at the Phoenix Open, thanks to a pair of large grandstands that flanked the green and a natural hill behind it creating a giant horseshoe of spectators.

Prior to 2002, all U.S. Opens had been staged at private golf venues that, while nominally open to the public, had several hundred dollar greens fees per round. Bethpage being selected in 2002 as the first publicly owned and operated golf course to host the tournament was seen as  an egalitarian move by the USGA.
The 2009 U.S. Open was fraught by continuous rain that resulted in multiple suspensions of play.  It was won by Lucas Glover. 2002 winner Tiger Woods was never a legitimate factor, and left the park within ten minutes of sinking his final putt. After completing his round Phil Mickelson declared that he would be taking significant time off to tend to his ailing wife, Amy, who had been recently diagnosed with breast cancer.

As in 2002, media coverage of the relationship between the New York gallery and Mickelson was one of the tournament's major headlines. The most memorable moment occurred following his tee shot on the short par-3 17th hole, where he was met by thunderous chants of "Let's Go!" as he approached the green.  Though his birdie putt came up short, he later commended the New York golf fans and suggested a Ryder Cup played at Bethpage Black would give U.S. players "a big advantage."

The USGA teamed up with World Golf Tour and co-hosted a 2009 Virtual US Open tournament to give fans a better experience of playing the difficult Black course. The winner earned a trip for two to the 2010 event in Pebble Beach. The Virtual U.S. Open attracted hundreds of thousands of players from more than 180 countries.

Recent tournaments

The annual Barclays tournament, the first of FedEx Cup playoff events, continued its rotation around the New York metropolitan area and was played at Bethpage State Park in 2012 in late August. As with the previous two U.S. Opens, the 2012 Barclays was played on the difficult Black course.
The Barclays returned for August 25–28, 2016. A total of 79 of its 120 entrants made the second-round cut at 145 (+3). Despite this total there was no secondary cut after the third round as in regular PGA Tour events, following a change made after the 2014 season. Patrick Reed won by a stroke over Emiliano Grillo and Sean O'Hair, moving from seventh place to first in the standings. The top 100 players in the points standings advanced to the Deutsche Bank Championship. This included five players who were outside the top 100 prior to the tournament. Five players also started within the top 100 but finished outside it, ending their playoff chances. The tournament was the last qualifying event for the eight qualifying places for the American team in the 2016 Ryder Cup.

The 2019 PGA Championship was played at the Bethpage Black Course from May 16 to May 19. Brooks Koepka won the tournament by two strokes at 8 under par.

Notable events

Future events

2024 Ryder Cup
On September 17, 2013, the PGA and State of New York announced that the 2019 PGA Championship and 2024 Ryder Cup will be played at Bethpage Black. The Ryder Cup was subsequently moved to 2025 because of the COVID-19 pandemic.

References

External links

New York State Parks- Bethpage Golf Courses
Golf Club Atlas Article
2009 U.S. Open Course Guide
Telegraph article on the Course
Golf Digest Guide to the Course
Sportlistings World of Sport Directory

1936 establishments in New York (state)
Golf clubs and courses designed by A. W. Tillinghast
Golf clubs and courses in New York (state)
Oyster Bay (town), New York
Ryder Cup venues
Sports venues completed in 1936
Sports venues in Nassau County, New York
State parks of New York (state)
Works Progress Administration in New York (state)